Don't Eat the Pictures: Sesame Street at the Metropolitan Museum of Art (or simply Don't Eat the Pictures) is a one-hour Sesame Street special that aired on PBS on November 16, 1983. The title comes from a song in the special, "Don't Eat the Pictures", sung by Cookie Monster. It was available as a video tape by Random House in 1987, and it was re-released on VHS by Sony Wonder in 1996 and on DVD in 2011. The special has everybody reprising their roles from the children's television series, Sesame Street. The story takes on getting locked in at New York City's Metropolitan Museum of Art as they embark on an adventure to find their friend Big Bird, who has gotten lost finding Snuffy. They must stay there until the morning while avoiding a night watchman. The special features the regular human cast of Sesame Street along with several of The Muppets, including Cookie Monster, Telly, Bert & Ernie, The Count, Grover, and Oscar the Grouch. Snuffy also appears, even though his names are revealed to be Mr. Snuffleupagus and Aloysius Snuffleupagus; however, at this point in the show's history, he is still the imaginary friend of Big Bird, never seen by the other characters on Sesame Street.

Plot
The Sesame Street gang have gone on a field trip to the Metropolitan Museum of Art. Big Bird has arranged to meet with Snuffy at the museum but before he can, it is closing time. Big Bird decides to go off and look for Snuffy. Before the group can leave, they realize Big Bird is missing and run all through the museum looking for him. The chase has them going through different exhibits at high speed and missing, spotting, and chasing him. After a bit, they give up, only to find that they are locked in the museum overnight. They decide to go back out and look for Big Bird and look at all the exhibits while they are at it.

Big Bird eventually finds Snuffy and they wander the Egyptian exhibit and encounter an Egyptian prince named Sahu (Aram Chowdhury) and his cat who have been cursed to remain on Earth until he answers the question "Where does today meet yesterday?" Through drawings, Sahu explains his dilemma. A demon appears to ask Sahu a question. If he does not know or answers incorrectly, the demon vanishes until the next night. If he answers correctly, he will then be taken to Osiris, who shall weigh Sahu's heart against a feather. If his heart is lighter, then he can rejoin his parents among the stars, but if it is heavier he will forever remain on earth. Big Bird considers all this too daunting and instead suggests Sahu remain on Earth and become "the only 4,000 year old kid on Sesame Street". However, Snuffy thinks it is only fair they help Sahu be reunited with his parents, and Big Bird agrees they should work on the riddle.

Meanwhile, the group has split up and are all in different exhibits. Bob and Cookie Monster find themselves looking at pictures with food in them. While Cookie Monster tries to eat the pictures, Bob points out to him a sign that says "Please don't eat the pictures". He replies with "Oh, this going to be a long night". He later sings the song "Don't Eat the Pictures" about this. Oscar finds an exhibit of Greek and Roman statues that have been broken by natural disasters. He looks in and breaks into song on how beautiful they are to him. Grover finds an exhibit filled with armor from medieval times and thinks a suit of Maximilian armour is a guy named "Max" and tries to befriend him by changing into his Super Grover costume and singing a song. Bert and Ernie view the painting of Washington Crossing the Delaware, to which Bert comments on the dedication of Washington and his men, but Ernie comments how he was very silly to cross in the winter and should have waited until Easter or taken the George Washington Bridge.

As the night passes, Big Bird and Snuffy continue to try to figure out the answer to the question. Soon, just before midnight, Big Bird unknowingly figures out the answer is "a museum". When the demon appears that night, the question is answered correctly and Sahu is sent to Osiris (Fritz Weaver) to have his heart weighed. When the feather to weigh his heart doesn't appear, Big Bird offers one of his to help. But when Sahu's heart is too heavy, Big Bird claims that it wasn't fair since Sahu was on Earth for 40 centuries and he was so alone his heart would be heavy, so he can't become a star.

After this, Sahu's heart becomes lighter and he is now ready to join his parents and take his cat. Big Bird and Snuffy then exit the museum, look up into the night sky, and see four stars in a straight line (representing Sahu, his parents, and his cat), and are glad that they reunited Sahu with his parents. When morning comes, Big Bird finds the group and Snuffy is not there. He got up early and left to get to "Snufflegarden", much to the gang’s frustration. Bob commends Cookie Monster for behaving himself inside the museum and rewards him by saying he can have anything for sale on a hot dog cart. Cookie Monster, in a fit of hunger and gladness, elects to eat everything, even the cart itself.

After the credits, Big Bird pretends to be a statue. He encourages the viewers to visit their local museum, and comments on how staying perfectly still is tiring and wonders how statues can do it.

Songs
"Broken and Beautiful" — sung by Oscar when he sees things that are broken, or beautiful (Caroll Spinney)
"I Want To Be Your Friend" — sung by Grover's alter ego, "Super Grover" while making friends at the museum (Frank Oz)
"Don't Eat the Pictures" — sung by Cookie Monster. In the end, he loves to devour something else if possible (Oz). Also sung by three angel monsters (Ivy Austin).
"You're Gonna Be A Star" — sung by Big Bird when he asks his friend to be a star (Spinney). Also sung by his friend, Sahu (Aram Chowdhury).
"Mothers and Children" — sung by Olivia when she learns all about mothers and their little children (Alaina Reed Hall)

The title song from Don't Eat the Pictures begins with Cookie Monster and his human friend, Bob McGrath in front of Still Life with Ham, a painting by Philippe Rousseau which Cookie Monster tries to devour. Bob holds Cookie Monster back and reminds him that he promised not to eat anything in the museum. Then Cookie Monster breaks into song, with angelic choral accompaniment, about paintings, statues, and mummies, and how he understands how important it is to not devour them.

Cast

Muppet performers
 Caroll Spinney as Big Bird and Oscar the Grouch
 Frank Oz as Cookie Monster, Bert, and Grover
 Jerry Nelson as Count von Count
 Martin P. Robinson as Snuffy and Telly (DVD Version)
 Bryant Young as Snuffy (assistant)
 Jim Henson as Ernie 
 Brian Muehl  as Telly (VHS Version)
 Richard Hunt
 Ivy Austin as Angels

Humans
 Linda Bove as Linda
 Northern Calloway as David
 Loretta Long as Susan
 Sonia Manzano as Maria
 Bob McGrath as Bob
 Roscoe Orman as Gordon
 Alaina Reed Hall as Olivia
 Aram Chowdhury as Egyptian Prince Sahu
 James Mason as Demon
 Fritz Weaver as Osiris
 Paul Dooley as Museum Night Watchman
 Li Alexander
 Jason Paul Janzer
 Nadia Jones
 Mika Kakizaki
 David Zetlin-Jones
 Andrew Cassese
 Jon Stone as Intercom Announcer
 Carol Kennedy (uncredited)

Crew
 Conceived and Written by: Tony Geiss
 Produced by: Lisa Simon, Arlene Sherman, Tony Geiss
 Music by: Joe Raposo, Tony Geiss, Stephen Lawrence, Christopher Cerf, Dick Lieb
 Arranger and Conductor: Dick Lieb
 Music Coordinator: Danny Epstein
 Music Assistant: Dave Connor
 Production Supervisor: Frieda Lipp
 Associate Directors: Robert J. Emerick, Ted May
 2nd Unit Director: Emily Squires
 Art Director: Victor DiNapoli
 Lighting Directors: David M. Clark, Jim Tetlow
 Muppets by: Caroly Wilcox, Kermit Love, Donald Sahlin with Ed Christie, Cheryl Blalock, Richard Termine, Noel MacNeal
 Production Stage Manager: Chet O'Brien
 Stage Manager: Niles Goodsite
 Set Decorator: Nat Mongioi
 Graphic Artist: Gerri Brioso
 Costume Designer: Bill Kellard
 Assistant to the Producers: Cheryl Ann Jung
 Production Assistants: Diane Mitchell, Mercedes Polanco, Thelma Moses, Danette Morganelli, Lynn Roberge, Stuart Lowery, Richard Grigonis
 Make-Up: Lee Halls
 Hairstylist: Karen Specht
 Wardrobe: Grisha Mynova
 Technical Director: Ralph Mensch
 Audio: Blake Norton
 Cameramen: Miguel Armstrong, Manny Gutierrez
 Video: Bob Haight
 Mobile Facilities Provided by: Reeves Teletape
 Videotape Editor: Matty Powers
 Sound Effects: Dick Maitland
 Engineer In Charge: Mark Schubin
 Executive Producer: Jim and Jane Henson, Joan Ganz Cooney, Lloyd Morrisett, Dulcy Singer
 Directed by: Jon Stone
 For the Metropolitan Museum of Art
 The Office of Film & Television: Karl Katz
 Production Coordinator: Caroline Kennedy
 With Special Thanks To: Philippe de Montebello · And To The Departments Of: American Art, Ancient Near Eastern Art, Arms & Armor, Buildings, Egyptian Art, European Paintings, European Sculpture & Decorative Arts, Far Eastern Art, Greek & Roman Art, Information Desk, Operations, Public Information, Primitive Art, Photograph & Slide Library, Photograph Studio, Security, Twentieth Century Art · Richard Morsches, Linda Sylling, Joseph Volpato, Al, Siciliano, Hiram Pabon, Tom Gaffney, & The Entire Staff Of The Metropolitan Museum Of Art · And To: Dr. William Gutsch - American Museum Of National History - Hayden Planetarium

See also
List of American films of 1983

References

External links

1983 television specials
Sesame Street features
Metropolitan Museum of Art
1980s American television specials
Museums in popular culture
Films set in museums
Films directed by Jon Stone